Kandy Sports Club (better known as Kandy SC) is a Division 'A' rugby union team, based in Kandy, Sri Lanka, competing in the Dialog Rugby League. The club has been the most successful Sri Lankan club in the Sri Lanka Rugby Championship, winning 18 league titles in the last twenty years, which is the most wins by any club since the expanded competition commenced in 1950. The club has also won twenty Clifford Cups and in the period between 1995 and 2012 the club did not lose a Clifford Cup title, although in 1998 there was no tournament and in 2006 the club withdrew from the tournament. Kandy SC had won the league title for a record nine consecutive years between 2000 and 2009.

History

The Kandy Sports Club was founded in 1874 by a group expatriate coffee planters and others working in the plantations sector in and around Kandy, as the Kandy Athletic, Boating, Cricket, Football and Dancing Club. In 1888, 14 years later, the name was changed to Kandy Sports Club when the club also started playing rugby, hockey and polo. The home grounds was Bogambara grounds  until 1939 when the British Colonial Army took over during the Second World War. Later the buildings were taken over by the General Hospital to house its offices, however Kandy SC continued to play rugby at the Bogambara grounds without a club house. In 1949 the Municipal Council released the garbage dumping ground area at Nittawela to the club.

From 1997 to 2009 Kandy SC has won every President's Trophy Knockout Tournament with the exception of the 1998 series, where it lost 26-30 in the final round to Ceylonese Rugby & Football Club (CR&FC).

On March 10, 2010 the rugby team of the Kandy Sports Club left for a 15-day tour of Dubai and South Africa. The club played one match in Dubai and two in South Africa. This was the first time Kandy SC toured two different countries on one tour.

Stadium
 Bogambara Stadium (until 1939)
 Nittawela Rugby Stadium

Players
The Kandy Sports Club was founded by a group expatriate coffee planters, however it has mainly had local players coming in from Kandyan school teams, namely Trinity College, Kandy and tradition in Sri Lanka, Kingswood College which was the first school to introduce rugby in Sri Lanka (by L. E. Blaze, an Old-Trinitian), though it gave up the game soon after and St. Anthony’s College which joined in as a progressive force. Other schools like Vidyartha College, Dharmaraja College and St. Sylvester's College have also had a long history in the sport while producing many players.

Current squad
The squad as of January 2022

Nigel Ratwatte

Sanushka Abeywickrama

Heshan Jansen

Tharinda Rathwatte

Dilushka Dange

Srinath Sooriyabandara

Chathura Zoysa

Lasitha Attangoda

Ali Mohamed

Charles Praveen

Thilina Bandara

Roshan Weerarathne

Jason Dissanayake

Notable Foreign Players

 Kitioni Ratudrara - Fiji international.
 Bati Penia - Fiji international.
 Meli Nakauta - Fiji international.
 Viliame Satala - Fiji international.
 Apisai Nagata - Fiji international
 Etonio Quro - Fiji international
 Manasa Qoro - Fiji international
 Tavita Tulagese
 Chris Cloete

Notable players
The Kandy Sports Club has had some notable players including players who have played internationally and internationals who have played for Kandy. Some notable players include: Sri Lanka skipper and dynamic Anthonian Priyantha Ekanayake with Lakshaman Ekanayake, Indrajith Bandaranayake, Nalaka Weerakkoddy, Leroy Fonseka, Manjula Pathirana, Shyam Sideek, Rizvi Suhaib, Inthi Marikar, Lasantha Wijesuriya, Fijians Kitioni Ratrudradra, Bati Penaia, Tony Greanny and Viliame Satala.

Out of the key expat players over the years Meli Nakauta & Viliame Satala have represented Fiji in the World Cup in 1999, Manasa Qoro in 1987, while Kitioni Ratudrara,  & Apisai Nagata have also represented Fiji at the highest level

Achala Perera
Amila Bandara
Ananda Kasthuriarachchi
Aravinda Udangamuwa
Bati Penaia
Buddhi Talagampola
Chamara Withanage
Dharshana Ettipola
Dilip Selvam
Erande Swarnatillake
Faizal Marija
Gayan Ratnage
Gayan Weeraratne
Haris Omar
Inthi Marikar

Imran Bisthamin
Indrajith Banaranayake
Kasun Silva
Kasun Yasaisuru
Kishore Jehan
Kitioni Ratrudradra
Krishantha Rajapakse
Kusal Rankothge
Lakshaman Ekanayake
Lalantha Karunatilake
Lasantha Wijesuriya
Leroy Fonseka
Malinga Godigamuwa
Manjula Pathirana
Mohammed Jabbar
Mohammed Rizvy
Mohammed Sabry
Mohammed Sheriff

Nalaka Weerakkody
Navinda Pullukuttiarachchi
Niranjan Ranasinghe
Pradeep Basnayake
Pradeep Liyanage
Prasad Chathuranga
Priyantha Ekanayake
Radhika Hettiarachchi
Rizvi Suhaib
Roshan Weeraratne
Sajith Saranga
Saliya Kumara
Sameera Silva
Sanjeewa Jayasinghe
Satala Vallimoni
Sean Wijesinghe
Senaka Bandara
Shashika Jayawardena

Shyam Sideek
Sumedha Jayasinghe
Tony Greanny
Viliame Satala

Coaches
 Maurice Perera
 Johan Taylor
Tavita Tulagese
Neil Foote 2013
 Johan Taylor 2014
Sean Mark Wijesinghe 2015/16

Kit manufacturers and shirt sponsors

Club honours
 Dialog League:
 Champions: 1994, 1995, 1997, 1999, 2001, 2002, 2003, 2004, 2005, 2006, 2007, 2008, 2009, 2010, 2011, 2015, 2016-17, 2017-18
2018-19
 Runners up: 1954, 1955, 1969, 1978,
 Clifford Cup:
 Champions: 1992, 1993, 1995, 1996, 1997, 1999, 2000, 2001, 2002, 2003, 2004, 2005, 2007, 2008, 2009, 2010, 2011, 2012, 2015, 2016

See also
 Kandy Sports Club

References

External links
 Official website
 Provincial Unions
 Kandy SC Will Continue To Dominate Rugby
 Kandy Sports Club — This Season’s Favourite
 Kandy Sports Club head points table
 Old Zahirians SC pull out from President's Trophy rugby tourney

Sri Lankan rugby union teams
Rugby clubs established in 1874
Sport in Kandy
1874 establishments in Ceylon